Camilla Dalberg, (1870–1968), was a German-American actress and writer known for her roles as Mrs. Clare in Tess of the D'Urbervilles (1913) and Mother in The Seven Sisters (1915), as well as numerous other stage and film roles throughout the 1910s and 1920s. Dalberg also wrote and starred in the short film After Many Days (1912).

Life 
Dalberg was born in Frankfurt, Germany on June 28, 1870 and was married to fellow actor Charles Kraus, with whom she appeared in The Seven Sisters (1915). Dalberg died in The Bronx, New York in February 1968. She was 97 years old.

Filmography

Stage roles

Sources 

American silent film actresses
1870 births
1968 deaths
German emigrants to the United States
Actors from Frankfurt
American stage actresses